Isais is a monotypic moth genus in the family Lasiocampidae first described by Erich Martin Hering in 1937. Its single species, Isais leipoxaides, described by the same author in the same year, is found in what is now the Democratic Republic of the Congo.

References 

Lasiocampidae